Minding may refer to:

Ferdinand Minding (1806–1885), German mathematician
Minding (horse), Thoroughbred racehorse

See also
Mind (disambiguation)